Buddy the Dentist is a 1934 Warner Bros. Looney Tunes cartoon directed by Ben Hardaway. The short was released on December 15, 1934, and stars Buddy, the second star of the series.

Summary
Buddy is preparing fudge for his girlfriend Cookie. When he walks away from his stove for a moment, Bozo the dog burns his tongue attempting to taste the mixture. Buddy returns with a tube to squirt the fudge onto a pan, disregarding the odd behavior of his pet. As he arranges the fudge on a pan, he tosses some into Bozo's mouth while lecturing the dog on how harmful candy can be to a dog's teeth.

Buddy orders the dog to sit and tells him to be quiet as he telephones Cookie to give her tidings of the treat he has prepared for her. The two discuss vanilla (which Buddy always uses for fudge). Meanwhile, Bozo wanders off, back to the kitchen, and spills the fudge all over the floor, then eating it and, true to Buddy's admonition, causing a sharp spike to hurt his teeth. The dog yelps in pain, Buddy yells, "Shut up!" which Cookie misinterprets as being directed towards her. She hangs up.

Buddy walks into the kitchen, finds his fudge ruined and Bozo hiding under a table. Buddy pulls the dog out from under the table and tells him that "candy would hurt his teeth." Buddy attempts to remove his dog's loose tooth with pliers. Discovering "Dr. Mohler: Painless Dentist's" calendar, Buddy has an idea to use nitrous oxide. Buddy attaches a gas pipe with a mouthpiece to Bozo's mouth, and the dog inflates and floats upward. Buddy gets him down with a vacuum cleaner, which then explodes, trapping Buddy in an ironing board compartment. Buddy next decides to tie one end of a string to a dog toy, the other to Bozo's damaged tooth. When that only serves to amuse the animal, Buddy decides to tie up the tooth and tie the other end of the string to a doorknob, the closing action of the door then serving to force the loose tooth from the dog's gums.

Bozo is trepidatious, but Buddy is preparing to demonstrate how little the method hurts when a domestic cat comes in. The feline spooks the dog so much that Bozo, still attached by the string to Buddy, chases the creature out of the house. They go through fountains until Buddy becomes trapped in a toy wagon. The cat gets away, but Buddy and his dog become trapped in a hammock occupied by Cookie. All three emerge from the fallen hammock and Buddy discovers that he has the troubled tooth, but Cookie, only mildly disgusted, finds a tooth clearly missing from Buddy's mouth.

Millar and Frisby
Early in the cartoon, Buddy is seen to be making his fudge with "Millar's Cocoa", a reference to Melvin Millar. Later on, as Bozo chases the cat (and drags Buddy along), they pass a billboard that advertises "Frisby", a reference to Friz Freleng. A similar reference to Freleng occurs in High Diving Hare.

Dating discrepancy
As with many Buddy cartoons, sources differ on the release date of Buddy the Dentist. This article's placement is in accord with the article Looney Tunes and Merrie Melodies filmography (1929-1939), which proposes a different order and date than Leonard Maltin's Of Mice and Magic, hereinbefore cited. For more on such conflicts, see the relevant section of the article on Buddy's Circus.

References

External links
 
 

1934 films
1934 animated films
1930s American animated films
1930s animated short films
American black-and-white films
Films scored by Norman Spencer (composer)
Films about dentistry
Films about dogs
Films directed by Ben Hardaway
Buddy (Looney Tunes) films
Looney Tunes shorts